Luiz Eduardo Purcino (born 29 December 1988), known as Dudu, is a Brazilian professional football player who plays as a forward and also can play as a winger.

Dudu scored 10 goals for Buriram PEA in the 2010 Thai Premier League season. Runner up and foreigner top score of the club. He was released from Buriram PEA in January 2011.

References

External links
 

1988 births
Living people
Brazilian footballers
Brazilian expatriate footballers
Luiz Eduardo Purcino
Luiz Eduardo Purcino
MISC-MIFA players
Expatriate footballers in Thailand
Brazilian expatriate sportspeople in Thailand
Expatriate footballers in Cambodia
Association football forwards
Association football midfielders
Brazilian expatriate sportspeople in Cambodia